Harriet Amelia Thorpe (born 8 June 1957) is an English actress. Thorpe trained at London's Central School of Speech and Drama. She is known for her roles in the British sitcoms, The Brittas Empire (1991–97) and Absolutely Fabulous (1992–2012) and has also starred in the West End musicals, Cabaret (2006), Wicked (2008) and Mamma Mia! (2010).

Career

TV
She appeared in the mid-to-late 1990s British television sitcom The Brittas Empire, playing Carole Parkinson, the receptionist who was prone to depression and fits of emotion who permanently kept her children with her in drawers under her desk, and would sometimes be seen feeding them or washing their clothes. Thorpe also starred in a celebrity edition of The Weakest Link as Madame Morrible, in which she was voted off in the first round.

Thorpe played Fleur in Absolutely Fabulous, an eccentric and somewhat odd work-colleague. Along with working extensively with Dawn French and Jennifer Saunders, she has appeared in BBC2's Alexei Sayle's Stuff, A Bit of Fry and Laurie; BBC's Casualty, Material Girl and ITV's The Bill, Midsomer Murders and the sitcom Me, You and Him. She played Beverley Osman in the BBC children's comedy drama No Sweat, starring boyband North and South. She made a guest appearance in Channel 4 soap opera, Hollyoaks as Elizabeth.  In 2020 she played Nanny Ribble in an episode of Father Brown and in 2021 she guest starred in another episode of Midsomer Murders and in episode of Doctors. In September 2021, Thorpe played Miss Newell in Endeavour.

Film
Thorpe has appeared in numerous films, such as Calendar Girls as the rather patronising and superior head of the Women's Institute; Mike Leigh's Life is Sweet; Greystoke; The Calling; and S.N.U.B.

Theatre
Thorpe has appeared on stage. She worked extensively at the Royal National Theatre, in London's West End and two Shakespeare seasons at the Regent's Park Open Air Theatre. She was in the original revival cast of Cabaret as Fraulein Kost at the Lyric Theatre in London on 22 September 2006. Prior to this, she played Mrs. Lovett in the national tour of Stephen Sondheim's Sweeney Todd: The Demon Barber of Fleet Street, originated the role of Ida Arnold in the Almeida Theatre's original musical, Brighton Rock, and played the role of Madame Thenardier in the hit musical, Les Misérables.

On 14 April 2008, she took over the role of Madame Morrible from Susie Blake in the West End production of Wicked. She played her final performance on 27 March 2010, and was replaced by Julie Legrand.

Thorpe took over the role of Tanya from Jane Gurnett in the West End production of Mamma Mia! on 14 June 2010.

She returned to the Open Air Theatre, Regent's Park to play the parts of Lottie Childs and Patricia Fodor in Timothy Sheader and Stephen Mear's revival of Crazy For You, for which she was nominated for the 2012 Theatregoers' Choice Awards 

Thorpe returned to Wicked to play Madame Morrible from Monday 22 April 2013 until Saturday 16 November 2013, in place of Louise Plowright who withdrew from the role due to illness.

In 2018, Thorpe joined the cast of Ruthless! The Musical as Miss Myrna Thorn.

Ambassador

Thorpe is an ambassador for Walk the Walk, the UK's largest grant-making breast cancer charity, and the UK's Diversity In Media Awards (DIMAS)

Her sister is the actress Matilda Thorpe.

Filmography

Film

Television

References

External links

1957 births
Living people
English television actresses
Actresses from London